Bondre is a surname. Notable people with the surname include:

Kalyani Bondre (born 1981), Indian academic and classical vocalist
Rahul Siddhvinayak Bondre, Indian politician
Vishwanath Bondre (1936–2014), Indian cricketer

See also
Bonde